Geraint Jenkins may refer to:
 J. Geraint Jenkins (1929–2009), Welsh maritime historian and historian of rural crafts
 Geraint H. Jenkins (born 1946), historian of Wales and the Welsh language